"Maldito Alcohol" (Spanish for Damned Alcohol) is a song by Cuban-American rapper Pitbull from his fifth studio album, Armando. It was released as the album's second official single on October 25, 2010 as a CD single and digital download. It was produced by Afrojack and DJ Buddha.

Music video
The music video was released onto Pitbull's official VEVO channel on December 17, 2010. It has received over 22 million views.

In popular culture
The single was featured in the 2011 game, Saints Row: The Third.

Charts

Release history

References

2010 singles
Pitbull (rapper) songs
Afrojack songs
Spanish-language songs
Songs written by Pitbull (rapper)
Songs written by Afrojack
2009 songs
Songs written by DJ Buddha
Song recordings produced by DJ Buddha